Roy Charles Easterwood (January 12, 1915 – August 24, 1984) was a  Major League Baseball catcher who played for the Chicago Cubs in 1944.

Easterwood is one of many ballplayers who only appeared in the major leagues during World War II.  He made his major league debut on April 21, 1944 in a home game against the St. Louis Cardinals at Wrigley Field.

His season and career totals for 17 games include a .212 batting average (7-for-33), one  home run, 2 runs batted in, one run scored, and a .364 slugging percentage.  In 12 appearances as a catcher he handled 33 chances without an error for a fielding percentage of 1.000.

Easterwood died at the age of 69 in Graham, Texas.

External links

1915 births
1984 deaths
Baseball players from Texas
Birmingham Barons players
Chicago Cubs players
Dallas Eagles players
Durham Bulls players
Fort Worth Cats players
Houston Buffaloes players
Indianapolis Indians players
Little Rock Travelers players
Los Angeles Angels (minor league) players
Major League Baseball catchers
Marshall Tigers players
Milwaukee Brewers (minor league) players
Nashville Vols players
People from Waxahachie, Texas
Peoria Reds players
Portland Beavers players
Tulsa Oilers (baseball) players
Waterloo Red Hawks players